Jerry Norman may refer to:

Jerry Norman (sinologist) (1936–2012), American sinologist and linguist
Jerry Norman (basketball) (born 1929/1930), American basketball coach and player